北山, meaning "northern mountain(s)", may refer to:

Mandarin Chinese pinyin reading Bĕishān:
Beishan, Changsha County, town in Hunan Province, People's Republic of China

Korean reading Buksan:
Buksan, late Joseon period painter

Japanese on-yomi Hokuzan or kun-yomi Kitayama:
Hokuzan, 14th-century Okinawa kingdom
Kitayama, Wakayama, exclave village of Wakayama on the Mie–Nara border, Japan
Kitayama Station (Kōchi)
Kitayama Station (Kyoto)
Kitayama Station (Miyagi)
Kitayama Station (Tochigi)